Magma Design Automation was a software company in the electronic design automation (EDA) industry. The company was founded in 1997 and maintained headquarters in San Jose, California, with facilities throughout North America, Europe and Asia. Magma software products were used in major elements of integrated circuit design, including: synthesis, placement, routing, power management, circuit simulation, verification and analog/mixed-signal design.

Magma was acquired by Synopsys in a merger finalized February 22, 2012 at a cash value of about $523 million, or $7.35 per share.

History
Magma was founded in 1997 by a team including Rajeev Madhavan, who served as chairman, CEO and president from the company's inception. The company initially competed primarily with Cadence and Avanti Corporation in physical design but eventually broadened its product portfolio and competed with all three of the largest established EDA companies: Cadence, Mentor Graphics and Synopsys. Magma had a particularly strong presence in the convergence device segment through key customers such as Qualcomm, Broadcom and Texas Instruments. In 2001 Roy Jewell joined Magma as chief operating officer and later that year added the title of president.

Magma completed an initial public offering on Nasdaq, under the ticker symbol LAVA, on November 20, 2001 — the last EDA company to go public — and achieved its peak annual revenue of $214.4 million in its 2008 fiscal year. Magma was the fourth largest EDA company by revenue.

In 2002 Magma was named to the Red Herring 100 for innovation and business strategy. In 2005 Forbes ranked Magma No. 2 on its list of fastest-growing technology companies.

Key Products and Applications
Talus: Digital chip implementation.
Tekton: Static timing analysis.
Titan: Analog/mixed-signal design.
FineSim SPICE: Circuit simulation.
SiliconSmart: Library Characterization.
Quartz DRC and Quartz LVS: Physical verification.

Magma software was used to design chips for cell phones, networking, automotive products, electronic games, portable music players and digital media.

Companies Acquired
Magma acquired about a dozen companies during its existence, among them Moscape (2000), Silicon Metrics (2003), Mojave (2004), Knights Technology (2006), ACAD Corp. (2006)  and Sabio Labs (2008).

Patent Dispute
Magma was involved in a legal dispute with Synopsys beginning in September 2004, when Synopsys sued Magma for allegedly infringing two patents. Claims and counter-claims accelerated, resulting in separate court cases in California and Delaware, and a number of disputed patents. On March 29, 2007, Magma and Synopsys announced the companies had agreed to settle all pending litigation between them. As part of the settlement Magma made a $12.5 million payment to Synopsys and each company cross-licensed four previously disputed patents to the other.

Synopsys Acquisition
On November 30, 2011, Magma and Synopsys announced they had entered into a definitive agreement by which Synopsys would buy Magma for $507 million US$. The merger was finalized on February 22, 2012, with cash value of the transaction at about $523 million, or $7.35 per Magma share.

Key people
Rajeev Madhavan, chairman of the board and chief executive officer

References

External links
Magma homepage

Electronic design automation companies
Companies based in San Jose, California
Companies established in 1997